George James Gates (2 June 1883 – 23 June 1960) was an English professional football right half and forward who appeared in the Football League for Clapton Orient and Grimsby Town. He later player-managed Welsh non-league club Bargoed.

Career statistics

References

1883 births
English footballers
Footballers from Hammersmith
Brentford F.C. players
English Football League players
Association football inside forwards
Association football wing halves
Grimsby Town F.C. players
Southern Football League players
Merthyr Town F.C. players
Leyton Orient F.C. players
1960 deaths
English football managers